Peter Wall (born 1975) is a Canadian video journalist (VJ) based in Toronto, currently working for CBC Television's The National.  As a VJ, he reports, writes, shoots and edits his own stories and documentaries.

From 2001 to 2009 he worked as a VJ for the news magazine CBC News: Sunday. Prior to that he was a VJ for Culture Shock, which aired on CBC Newsworld.
Wall has a master's degree in journalism from the University of British Columbia, and a philosophy degree from Bishop's University.  He has also studied in South Korea and South Africa.

In 2000, he was awarded a Donaldson Scholarship at the CBC. In 2006 his story “Mission House” was nominated for a Gemini award as the Best Newsmagazine Segment. In 2008 Wall won a CAJ/CIDA fellowship and traveled to Colombia.

External links
Canadian Association of Journalists Fellowship recipients

Canadian television journalists
Bishop's University alumni
University of British Columbia alumni
1975 births
Living people